"The Right Time" is a song by British group Ultra. It was released on 28 September 1998 on in the United Kingdom through East West Records as the third single from their debut album, Ultra (1999).

Track listing
 CD1 (EW182CD1)
 "The Right Time"  (Radio Edit)  - 3:45
 "Stereotype" - 3:53
 "The Right Time"  (Acoustic Version) - 3:02

CD2
 "The Right Time"  (Radio Edit)  - 3:45
 "The Right Time"   (Handbaggers Remix) - 6:20
 CD_Rom Video "The Right Time" - 3:55

Weekly charts

Release history

References

1998 singles
1998 songs
Ultra (British band) songs
East West Records singles